Utkarsh Patel (born 25 April 1974) is an Indo-Canadian Entrepreneur.

References

External links
 

1987 births
Living people
Indian cricketers
Baroda cricketers
People from Vizianagaram district